Three-man chess is a chess variant for three players invented by George R. Dekle Sr. in 1984. The game is played on a hexagonal board comprising 96 quadrilateral cells. Each player controls a standard army of chess pieces.

Three-man chess was included in World Game Review No. 10 edited by Michael Keller.

Game rules
The illustration shows the starting setup; each player's queen is placed to the left of his king. White moves first and play proceeds clockwise around the board. Pieces move the same as they do in chess, with some special features described below. Standard conventions apply including castling, a pawn's initial two-step option, en passant, and promotion. The first player to checkmate an opponent wins the game.

Special move features
 A queen or bishop moving along a  will change square colors when crossing the center of the board.
 A knight jumps in a familiar "L" pattern of the chess knight: two steps orthogonally in the same direction, then one step orthogonally to the side. Jumping by other than a (2,1) leap is not permitted.
A pawn always captures to a square of the same color.
 A pawn that reaches its fifth rank gains the ability to move orthogonally in any direction, and to capture diagonally in any direction. However, it may not reenter its home one-third portion of the board.

Stalemate
A player who is stalemated loses his turns to move, unless/until an opponent plays a move that releases the stalemate condition. While stalemated, his king is still subject to checkmate, and his other pieces are still subject to capture.

See also
 Three-player chess
 Also by George Dekle:
 Tri-chess – a three-player variant with triangular cells
 Quatrochess – a four-player variant with square cells
 Triangular chess – a two-player variant on a hexagonal board with triangular cells

Notes

References

Bibliography

Chess variants
1984 in chess
Board games introduced in 1984